The Gulf of Tomini, also known as the Bay of Tomini, is the equatorial gulf which separates the Minahassa (Northern) and East Peninsulas of the island of Sulawesi (Celebes) in Indonesia. The Togian Islands lie near its center. To the east, the Gulf opens onto the Molucca Sea.

Extent

The International Hydrographic Organization (IHO) defines the Gulf of Tomini as being one of the divisions of the East Indian Archipelago. It is defined as the waters west of the "Western limit of the Molukka Sea", which is elsewhere defined as the line running from "Tg. Pasir Pandjang... across to Tg. Tombalilatoe (123° 21′ E) on the opposite coast".

References

Citations

Bibliography
 .

Tomini
Bays of Indonesia
Landforms of Sulawesi
Landforms of Gorontalo (province)